Vitis tsoii is a species of wild grape in the family Vitaceae. It is native to the provinces of Fujian, Guangdong, and Guangxi in China, where the climate is temperate.

Gallery

External links
Flora of China: Vitis tsoii
Plants of the World Online: Vitis tsoii
Global Biodiversity Information Facility: Vitis tsoii

References

tsoii
Plants described in 1932
Flora of China